Sergio Campana may refer to:

 Sergio Campana (footballer) (born 1934), Italian former footballer and lawyer
 Sergio Campana (racing driver) (born 1986), Italian automobile racing driver